This page provides the summaries of the AFC fourth round matches for 2014 FIFA World Cup qualification.

Format
The fourth round saw the five group winners and five group runners-up from the third round split into two groups of five. The top two teams from each group advanced to the 2014 FIFA World Cup finals in Brazil, while the two third-placed teams advanced to the fifth round.

Seeding
The draw for round four was held on 9 March 2012 in Kuala Lumpur, Malaysia, with the teams seeded according to their March 2012 FIFA Ranking. The FIFA rankings used were released on 7 March 2012 and included all matches from the third round of Asian Qualifiers for the 2014 FIFA World Cup. The ten teams (shown below with their March 2012 FIFA Ranking in brackets, and their positions in the third round in small brackets) are split into five pots, with each group containing a team from each pot.

Groups
The matches were played from 3 June 2012 to 18 June 2013.

As the last matchday overlaps with the 2013 FIFA Confederations Cup (which commences on 15 June 2013), the fourth round draw was adjusted to ensure Japan (the representative of the AFC for the Confederations Cup) received a bye on 18 June 2013, by placing them on Position 5 (instead of Position 2 where Japan were supposed to be placed as of the date of draw) in their group in order not to play on the last matchday.

Lebanon defender Ramez Dayoub was convicted of match-fixing after his back pass led to the only goal of the match in a 1–0 defeat by Qatar. Dayoub was suspended for life by the Lebanese Football Association.

Group A

Group B

Goalscorers
There were 86 goals scored in 40 games, for an average of 2.15 goals per game.

5 goals

 Keisuke Honda

3 goals

 Tim Cahill
 Reza Ghoochannejhad
 Javad Nekounam
 Ryoichi Maeda
 Shinji Okazaki
 Ahmad Hayel
 Lee Keun-Ho

2 goals

 Archie Thompson
 Mohammad Reza Khalatbari
 Shinji Kagawa
 Yuzo Kurihara
 Ahmed Mubarak Al Mahaijri
 Sebastián Soria
 Kim Bo-Kyung
 Ulugbek Bakayev
 Bahodir Nasimov
 Sanzhar Tursunov

1 goal

 Mark Bresciano
 Brett Holman
 Joshua Kennedy
 Robbie Kruse
 Lucas Neill
 Tommy Oar
 Luke Wilkshire
 Alaa Abdul-Zahra
 Hammadi Ahmad
 Nashat Akram
 Younis Mahmoud
 Hiroshi Kiyotake
 Hassan Abdel-Fattah
 Khalil Bani Attiah
 Tha'er Bawab
 Amer Deeb
 Ali Al Saadi
 Roda Antar
 Hassan Maatouk
 Ismail Al Ajmi
 Mohammed Al Balushi
 Juma Darwish Al-Mashri
 Abdulaziz Al-Muqbali
 Yusef Ahmed
 Khalfan Ibrahim
 Abdulgadir Ilyas Bakur
 Kim Chi-Woo
 Kim Shin-Wook
 Koo Ja-Cheol
 Kwak Tae-Hwi
 Lee Dong-Gook
 Son Heung-Min
 Odil Ahmedov
 Server Djeparov
 Jasur Hasanov
 Oleg Zoteev

1 own goal

 Mile Jedinak (playing against Oman)
 Akmal Shorakhmedov (playing against South Korea)
 Ki Sung-Yueng (playing against Uzbekistan)
 Artyom Filiposyan (playing against South Korea)

Notes

See also
2014 FIFA World Cup qualification (AFC)

References

External links
Results and schedule (FIFA.com version)
Results and schedule (the-AFC.com version)

4
2012 in Asian football
2013 in Asian football
2012–13 in Iranian football
qual
2012–13 in Qatari football
2012–13 in Lebanese football
2012–13 in Jordanian football
2012–13 in Omani football
2012–13 in Iraqi football
2012 in Uzbekistani football
2013 in Uzbekistani football
2012 in South Korean football
2013 in South Korean football
qual
2012 in Australian soccer
2013 in Australian soccer
qual
2012 in Japanese football
2013 in Japanese football
qual